The Zambian Second Division, also known as Division due to sponsorship reasons, was the second division of the Football Association of Zambia. But the league pyramid was restructured before the season of 2019/20 when they also changed the league calendar to match the CAF calendar. For the new second highest league see Zambia National Division One.
The League consisted of 64 teams that are distributed into four zones .

Zone One: Lusaka and Eastern Provinces

Zone Two: Copperbelt,  North Western and Luapula Province

Zone Three: Muchinga,  Central and Northern Provinces

Zone Four: Southern and Western Provinces

Clubs
ZONE ONE

1.Chipata City Council

2.Lundazi United

3.Katete Rangers

4.Petauke United

5.Circuit City

6.City of Lusaka F.C.

7.Paramilitary

8.Lusaka City Council

9.Lusaka Tigers

10.Young Green Buffaloes

11.Wonderful

12.Kafue Celtic

13. Happy Hearts

14.Police College

15.Rifflemen

16.Zesco Malaiti Rangers

ZONE TWO

1. Kansanshi Dynamos

2. Gomes

3. Indeni

4. Mufulira Wanderers F.C.

5. Chambishi F.C.

6. FQMO Mining Operation

7. Konkola Blades

8.Ndola United

9.Kalulushi Modern Stars

10.Mining Rangers

11.Roan United

12. Trident

13. FQMO Roads

14. Kashikishi Warriors

15. ZNS Lwamfumu

16. Mufulira Blackpool

ZONE THREE

1.Real Nakonde

2.Tazara Express

3. Tazara Rangers

4. Mpulungu harbour football club

5. Malalo Police

6. Kasama Young Fighters

7. Kasama Youth Soccer Academy

8. Chindwin Sentries

9. Prison Leopards

10. Zambeef

11. Riverside

12. Muchinga Blue Eagles

13. Isoka Young Stars

14. Intersport

15. Kateshi Coffee Bullets

16. Mpande Youth Soccer  Academy

ZONE FOUR

•Kascol Rangers

•Mumbwa Medics

•Chikuni Coops

•Zesco Victoriafalls

•Livingstone Pirates

•Mazabuka United

•Luena Buffaloes

•Maamba Energy Stars

•Sinazongwe United

•Maramba Stars

•Yeta

•Choma Football Stars

•Kalomo Jetters

•Zesco Shockers

•Young Green Eagles

•Manchester UZ Academy

Simonga Youth Academy 

Ref bwezani with Zambian Football

References

Football leagues in Zambia